Bottoms Up! is  the second album by jazz group The Three Sounds featuring performances recorded in 1958 and 1959 and released on the Blue Note label.

Reception

The Allmusic review by Scott Yanow awarded the album 3 stars stating "Pianist Gene Harris, bassist Andy Simpkins and drummer Bill Dowdy are in top form performing their brand of funky jazz, which left plenty of room for inventive solos along with the percolating grooves... Well worth searching for".

Track listing
 "Bésame Mucho" (Consuelo Velázquez) - 4:02
 "Angel Eyes" (Matt Dennis) - 5:10
 "Time After Time" (Sammy Cahn, Jule Styne) - 4:51
 "Love Walked In" (George Gershwin, Ira Gershwin) - 6:05
 "I Could Write a Book" (Lorenz Hart, Richard Rodgers) - 4:52
 "Jinne Lou" (Gene Harris) - 4:54
 "Nothing Ever Changes My Love for You" (Marvin Fisher, Jack Segal) - 3:06
 "Falling in Love With Love" (Hart, Rodgers) - 6:43

Personnel
Gene Harris - piano, celeste track 6
Andrew Simpkins - bass
Bill Dowdy - drums

References

Blue Note Records albums
The Three Sounds albums
1959 albums
Albums produced by Alfred Lion
Albums recorded at Van Gelder Studio